The Phi Phi Islands are an island group in Thailand between the large island of Phuket and the Straits of Malacca coast of Thailand. The islands are administratively part of Krabi Province. Ko Phi Phi Don (ko  'island') is the largest and most populated island of the group, although the beaches of the second largest island, Ko Phi Phi Le are visited by many people as well. The rest of the islands in the group, including Bida Nok, Bida Nai, and Bamboo Island (Ko Mai Phai), are not much more than large limestone rocks jutting out of the sea. The islands are reachable by speedboats or long-tail boats most often from Krabi town or from piers in Phuket Province.

Phi Phi Don was initially populated by Thai Malays fishermen during the late-1940s, and later became a coconut plantation. The resident Thai population of Phi Phi Don remains more than 80 percent Muslim. The current population however—if counting transient workers—is more Buddhist than Muslim. The resident population is between 2,000 and 3,000 people (2013).

The islands came to worldwide prominence when Ko Phi Phi Le was used as a location for the 2000 British-American film The Beach. This attracted criticism, with claims that the film company had damaged the island's environment - the producers supposedly bulldozed beach areas and planted palm trees to make it better resemble descriptions in the book, an accusation the filmmakers contest. An increase in tourism was attributed to the film's release, which resulted in increased environmental degradation. Phi Phi Le is home to the "Viking Cave", where there is a thriving industry harvesting edible bird's nests.

Ko Phi Phi was devastated by the Indian Ocean tsunami of December 2004, when nearly all of the island's infrastructure was destroyed.

History 

The name Phi Phi (pronounced "phi-phi") originates from Malay. The original name for the islands was Pulau Api-Api ('the fiery isle'). The name refers to the Pokok Api-Api, or "fiery tree" (grey mangrove) which is found on the islands.

Geography 
There are six islands in the group known as Phi Phi. There are limestone mountains with cliffs, caves, and long white sandy beaches.

Phi Phi Don and Phi Phi Le are the largest and best-known islands. In total, the islands occupy .

Administration 

There are two administrative villages on Ko Phi Phi under the administration of the Ao Nang sub-district, Mueang Krabi District, Krabi Province. There are nine settlements under these two villages.

The villages are:
Laem Thong (บ้านแหลมตง, Mu 8, between 300 and 500 people)
 Ban Ko Mai Phai (about 20 fishermen live on this island)
 Ban Laem Tong
 Ao Loh Bakhao
 Ao Lana

Ko Phi Phi (บ้านเกาะพีพี, Mu 7, between 1,500 - 2,000 people)
 Ao Maya (about 10 people, mostly in the ranger station)
 Ton Sai, the capital and largest settlement
 Hat Yao
 Ao Lodalum
 Laem Pho

Climate 
Hat Noppharat Thara - Mu Ko Phi Phi National Park is influenced by tropical monsoon winds. There are two seasons: the rainy season from May till December and the hot season from January till April.

Transportation and communication 
Roads
Since the re-building of Ko Phi Phi after the 2004 tsunami, paved roads now cover the vast majority of Ton Sai Bay and Loh Dalum Bay. All roads are for pedestrian use only with push carts used to transport goods and bags. The only permitted motor vehicles are reserved for emergency services. Bicycling is the most popular form of transport in Ton Sai.

Air
The nearest airports are at Krabi, Trang, and Phuket. All three have direct road and boat connections.

Ferry
There are frequent ferry boats to Ko Phi Phi from Phuket, Ko Lanta, and Krabi town starting at 08:30. Last boats from Krabi and Phuket depart at 14:30. In the "green season" (Jun-Oct), travel to and from Ko Lanta is via Krabi town only.

There is a large modern deep water government pier on Tonsai Bay, Phi Phi Don Village, completed in late-2009. It takes in the main ferry boats from Phuket, Krabi, and Ko Lanta. Visitors to Phi Phi Island must pay 20 baht on arrival at the pier. Dive boats, longtail boats, and supply boats have their own drop off points along the piers, making the pier highly efficient in the peak season.

Tourism 

The islands feature beaches and clear water, and the natural environment is protected by national park status. Tourism on the islands exploded since the release of the movie The Beach.

Phi Phi Le's Maya Bay was closed to tourists from June 2018 until the ecosystem recovers, but at least a year.

Attraction sites 
Some of the top attraction sites in Phi Phi Island include:

 Monkey Beach 
 May Bay 
 Mosquito Island
 Koh Phi Phi Leh
 Viking Cave
 Laem Tong Beach

Medical 
There is a small hospital on Phi Phi Island for emergencies. Its main purpose is to stabilize emergencies and evacuate to a Phuket hospital. It is between the Phi Phi Cabana Hotel and the Ton Sai Towers, about a 5–7 minute walk from the main pier.

2004 tsunami
On 26 December 2004, much of the inhabited part of Phi Phi Don was devastated by the Indian Ocean tsunami. The island's main village, Ton Sai (Banyan Tree), is built on a sandy isthmus between the island's two long, tall limestone ridges. On both sides of Ton Sai are semicircular bays lined with beaches.

Shortly after 10:00 on 26 December, the water from both bays receded. When the tsunami hit, at 10:37, it did so from both bays, and met in the middle of the isthmus. The force of the larger wave from Loh Dalum Bay pushed the tsunami and also breached low-lying areas in the limestone karsts, passing from Laa Naa Bay to Bakhao Bay, and at Laem Thong (Sea Gypsy Village), where 11 people died. Apart from these breaches, the east side of the island experienced only flooding and strong currents. A tsunami memorial was built to honor the deceased but has since been removed for the building of a new hotel in 2015.

At the time of the tsunami, the island had an estimated 10,000 occupants, including tourists.

Post-tsunami reconstruction

After the tsunami, approximately 70% of the buildings on the island had been destroyed. By the end of July 2005, an estimated 850 bodies had been recovered, and an estimated 1,200 people were still missing. The total number of fatalities is unlikely to be known. Local tour guides cite the figure 4,000. Of Phi Phi Don residents, 104 surviving children had lost one or both parents.

In the immediate aftermath of the disaster, the permanent residents were housed in a refugee camp at Nong Kok in Krabi Province.

On 6 January 2005, a former Dutch resident of Phi Phi, Emiel Kok, set up a voluntary organization, Help International Phi Phi ("HI Phi Phi"). HI Phi Phi recruited 68 Thai staff from the refugee camp, as well as transient backpacker volunteers (of whom more than 3,500 offered their assistance), and returned to the island to undertake clearing and rebuilding work. On 18 February 2005, a second organization, Phi Phi Dive Camp, was set up to remove the debris from the bays and coral reef, most of which was in Ton Sai Bay.

By the end of July 2005, 23,000 tonnes of debris had been removed from the island, of which 7,000 tonnes had been cleared by hand. "We try and do as much as possible by hand," said Kok, "that way we can search for passports and identification." The majority of buildings that were deemed fit for repair by government surveyors had been repaired, and 300 businesses had been restored. HI Phi Phi was nominated for a Time Magazine Heroes of Asia award.

As of 6 December 2005, nearly 1,500 hotel rooms were open, and a tsunami early-warning alarm system had been installed by the Thai government with the help of volunteers.

Impact of mass tourism

Since the tsunami, Phi Phi has come under greater threat from mass tourism. Dr Thon Thamrongnawasawat, an environmental activist and member of Thailand's National Reform Council, is campaigning to have Phi Phi tourist numbers capped before its natural beauty is completely destroyed. With southern Thailand attracting thousands more tourists every day, Dr Thon makes the point that the ecosystem is under threat and is fast disappearing. "Economically, a few people may be enriched, but their selfishness will come at great cost to Thailand", says Dr Thon, a marine biology lecturer at Kasetsart University and an established environmental writer.

More than one thousand tourists arrive on Phi Phi daily. This figure does not include those who arrive by chartered speedboat or yacht. All tourists arriving on the island pay a 20-baht fee at Ton Sai Pier to assist in "keeping Ko Phi Phi clean". "We collect up to 20,000 baht a day from tourists at the pier. The money is then used to pay a private company to haul the rubbish from the island to the mainland in Krabi to be disposed of", Mr Pankum Kittithonkun, Ao Nang Administration Organization (OrBorTor) President, said. The boat takes about 25 tonnes of trash from the island daily, weather permitting. Ao Nang OrBorTor pays 600,000 baht per month for the service. During high season, an Ao Nang OrBorTor boat is used to help transport the overflow of rubbish. Further aggravating Phi Phi's waste issues is sewage. "We have no wastewater management plant there. Our only hope is that hotels, restaurants and other businesses act responsibly – but I have no faith in them," Mr Pankum said. "They of course have to treat their own wastewater before releasing it into the sea, but they very well could just be turning the devices on before officers arrive to check them." The fundamental issue is that the budget allocated for Ao Nang and Phi Phi is based on its registered population, not on the number of people it hosts every year, Mr Pankum said.

In June 2018, Maya Beach, made famous by Leonardo DiCaprio's 2000 film The Beach, was closed indefinitely to allow it to recover. The beach used to receive up to 5,000 tourists and 200 boats a day.

Gallery

See also
 List of islands of Thailand
 Setjetting

References

External links

Koh Phi Phi Islands on video
Koh Phi Phi Islands on YouTube video
Ko Phi Phi Islands on video 

Islands of Thailand
Islands of the Strait of Malacca
Geography of Krabi province
Populated places in Krabi province